Cecilie Feo Feline (born in Hørsholm, July 21, 1994 with the name Cecilie Wellemberg) is a Danish model and beauty pageant titleholder who won Miss Universe Denmark 2015 and represented Denmark at the Miss Universe 2015 pageant.

Personal life
Cecilie is a student at Copenhagen Business School in Denmark. She finished her bachelor degree in Business economies and communication the 13. July 2017. She is currently a Danish influencer (@ceciliefeline) and blogger (Blogger's Delight) based in the heart of Copenhagen.

In 2015 Cecilie changed her name from 'Cecilie Wellemberg' to Cecilie Feo Feline after visiting a numerologist.

Model career 
Cecilie has been a model since she was only 12 years old, and even competed in Denmark's Elite Model Look in 2011. After the competition Cecilie signed a contract with Elite Models. She worked both as a runway and commercial model. She became the face of the big Danish fashion brand, Buch Copenhagen which is located in Copenhagen. In the same periode she competed in Miss Universe Denmark and won. After the danish she competed against 97 other women from all over the world and placed at nr. 17 overall in the international pageant.

Miss Universe Denmark 2015
Cecilie Feo Feline was crowned Miss Universe Denmark 2015 at AC Bella Sky Hotel, Copenhagen, Denmark on August 15, 2015. Cecilie represented Rungsted Kyst at the Face of Denmark competition, winning the top placement and securing the title of Miss Universe Denmark 2015. The Face of Denmark competition, was held for the first time in 2015 after the former national director of Miss Denmark lost the franchise for Miss Universe. Larissa Ramos (ME 2009) attended the first edition.

During her reign as Miss Universe Denmark, Cecilie is expected to be an ambassador of Denmark and a good example for young women. Cecilie represented her country at Miss Universe 2015, and placed at nr. 17 overall in the international pageant.

References

External links
Official site

Living people
Danish beauty pageant winners
Miss Universe 2015 contestants
1994 births
Danish female models
Danish bloggers
People from Hørsholm Municipality
Danish women bloggers